Gesellschaft zu Fraumünster is a guild–like organisation in Zürich, Switzerland, not yet associated with the Zünfte of Zürich as of 2015.

History of Gesellschaft zu Fraumünster 
In medieval times, in Zürich all female and male Bürger were members of the guilds, but beginning in the 19th century women were no more tolerated within the guilds then more as decoration of their men being still members of the guilds of Zürich. The history of the Gesellschaft zu Fraumünsters dates back to the late 9th century when the abbess of the Fraumünster Abbey (853 A.D.) in fact reigned the city of Zürich as Fürstäbtissin (imperial abbess) nominated by the king of the Holy Roman Empire, among them Katharina von Zimmern. Gesellschaft zu Fraumünster, being the society of the former noble women of the Fraumünster Abbey, was established in 1989. Now, the honorable women of the society cultivate the virtuous habits of the former abbey by p.e. honoring the work of engaged women in the modern society. Beginning fifteen years ago, the society started to organize every three years the so-called Mittelalter Spectaculum, a medieval funfair, at the Münsterhof square.

Sechseläuten and the guilds of Zürich 
Since 2010 the guilds of Zürich allow to the women of the society to practice Sechseläuten, as guests of the Constaffel society, for historical reasons as until 1524 AD the abbesses of the Fraumünster abbey were members of the Constaffel.

As of November 2014, expressly agreed by the guilds of Zürich, the Fraumünster society – still as guest, not as an official member – may practice Sechseläuten provisorily until 2022, as also confirmed by the association (Zentralkomitee der Zünfte) of the Zürich guilds. Mrs Regula Zweifel, representative of the Fraumünster society, told in an interview on 6 November 2014, ″... after 25 years, the tug of war is finally over. The fact that we now have guest status at Sechseläutenplatz, is great. But it is only a first step ...″ The association of guild members will, on occasion of an official ceremony, sign an agreement between the Fraumünster society and the so-called Zunftmeister's (literally: masters of the guilds) in December 2014: as long as the agreement applies, the Fraumünster society may participate namely the Sechseläuten procession and Böögg burning, but neither do any steps to join the assembly of the Zürich guilds nor participate other activities related to Sechseläuten.

Activities 
The association organizes monthly meetings, and its members are involved in numerous cultural projects, among them the honor book for women, a silent memorial to all women who do extraordinary things in everyday life and shape society actively.  Every three years the "Mittelalter Spectaculum" at the Münsterhof plaza is organized. Each year, the society honors posthumously female personalities with a plaque at their site of action in Zürich, and publishes a New Year's sheet.

Notable women awarded by the association 
The Fraumünster society posthumously honors women who have provided outstanding professional services or social innovations in Zürich. The honoring take place on the morning of the Sechseläuten festival and are public. Whenever possible, a plaque is attached to a former residence or place of activity of the honored women.

References

External links 

  

Feminist organisations in Switzerland
Organisations based in Zürich
1989 establishments in Switzerland
Organizations established in 1989
Guilds in Switzerland